Luz Jiménez Ormeño (born 18 December 1934) is a Chilean actress, theater director, and teacher who gained recognition for her performances in the roles of Maruja in the play  (1979) and Kiki Blanche in the telenovela  (1988). She has developed a career spanning 50 years, in which she gained popularity mainly as a theater and television actress.

Since then, she has been considered one of the country's most respected figures in the performing arts.

In 2015 she was recognized with a career award at the first .

In 2017 she obtained a small role in the Rede Globo series Os Dias Eram Assim.

Biography

Beginnings 
However she left her studies incomplete. "I left the theater for a love. I got married and then I had my four daughters." Later, she resumed her studies at the Catholic University's , graduating in 1979. During the 1970s she worked as a secretary in the vice-rectory of the university after the censorship of university theaters during Augusto Pinochet's military dictatorship.

She began her career between 1955 and 1960, participating in the various university and independent theater companies, acting in works such as El fin de febrero (1958) by Alejandro Sieveking, La princesa Panchita, Ocúpate de Amelia, and ¿Cuantos años tiene un día? by the  company.

1979–1990

Collective theater and world tour 
In 1979 Jiménez starred with Myriam Palacios, Soledad Alonso, and Loreto Valenzuela in the play  by David Benavente, directed by Raúl Osorio. It was created by Benavente and the Theater Research Workshop (TIT) at Santiago's Teatro Ángel. The work constitutes a milestone in the history of Chilean theater during the period of the dictatorship, given that it deals with the theme of unemployment of the time and machismo from the point of view of three women settlers who try to overcome poverty by weaving burlap in a workshop given by the Vicariate of Solidarity. The success of the play led her to make an international tour of America and Europe.

Collaboration with Sonia Fuchs 
This turned out to be a shaky experience for the established theater actress, but it served as a rapid introduction to television. After this opportunity the actress achieved a great friendship with Fuchs, collaborating on all her productions until 1991. Later she was part of the cast of La torre 10 (1984). The result was excellent. It not only satisfied the public, but also TVN. In the following years, she acted in the melodramas  (1985),  (1986),  (1986), and the miniseries .

Director Vicuña declared: "We tried many figures and we bet on her. For her charisma and great sweetness. It was not an easy role and she did it very well." In 1989 she took the part of one of the central characters of the highly successful series Teresa de los Andes, where she played a religious leader of a convent where Sister Teresa was played by Paulina Urrutia. According to the actress herself, this was one of the best characters she has played on television.

1991–1995

Training of new actors 
At the beginning of 1990, she withdrew temporarily from television to teach and train new actors. Between 1991 and 1995 she would join the faculty of The Theater Club of director Fernando González. Among her students were the actors Carolina Fadic, Tamara Acosta, Aline Küppenheim, Álvaro Morales, and Francisca Gavilán. Jiménez clarified, "What I have tried most to convey to you is that acting is a vocation, an inevitable passion that goes beyond the ego and that harbors a true curiosity about life, a desire to tell, a love for the game." According to Tamara Acosta, "She (Luz) was my first acting teacher. She was very important in my training; she had that wonderful thing about the warmth of putting together a team."

1997–2014

Collaboration with Sabatini and TVN's golden age 
After a period without major projects, Jiménez regained public favor in 1997 after participating in Oro Verde, again under the direction of Vicente Sabatini, where she gave life to a gossipy woman in charge of a popular hairdresser's in the fictional town of Los Robles in Caburga. The actress shared scenes with Álvaro Morales, José Soza, and Maricarmen Arrigorriaga. The following year, she obtained a secondary role in Amándote on Canal 13, directed by Ricardo Vicuña.

In 1999 she played Doña Mirta Jaramillo in La Fiera, a woman who believes in the myths and legends of Chiloé. The character had the hope that El Caleuche would return her husband who was missing in the ocean after a shipwreck. The actress managed to give an exceptional interpretation of the character, and was positioned as one of the most charismatic actresses of the year. In 2016, she declared "this character has always been in my heart."

At the beginning of the decade, she moved to Mejillones with the Sabatini team to join the cast of Romané (2000). In the telenovela she played the Roma character Mama Pasca Antich, the respected sister of the king of the ethnic colony, who fights against the pain and abandonment of her only son who went to the capital for an unrequited love. In the melodrama she shared credits with Juan Falcón, Claudia di Girolamo, Héctor Noguera, and Luis Alarcón. Like her previous character, she counts this as one of her best roles in television. In 2001 she participated in Pampa Ilusión, filmed at Humberstone and Santa Laura Saltpeter Works, where she played a southern prostitute named La Poroto, who together with her young colleague arrive at the fictional Pampa Ilusión office, hired to work in a clandestine brothel of a blind man who owns the place's only grocery store. Later came the comedy El circo de las Montini (2002) with Violeta Vidaurre, in which she played a sweet poodle trainer in the circus. In 2005 she starred with María Izquierdo and Ximena Rivas in the play Madre by Rodrigo Pérez.

In 2007 she participated in Corazón de María, where she played a reading and writing teacher for adults who did not have opportunities. The same year, she made an outstanding appearance in the drama , portraying an elderly inmate and sharing credits with Claudia Di Girolamo and Paulina García. In the latter she acted sharing credits with Benjamín Vicuña. She was also Acting Director at the School of Theater of the University of the Andes, which took first place in the National Festival of University Theater (FESTESA).

In 2010 Jiménez was hired by the Dramatic Area of Chilevisión under the direction of Vicente Sabatini, to play María Loreto Erdoíza y Aguirre in the historical bicentennial production Manuel Rodríguez. In an interview she said, "It is an honor to play this role. Manuel Rodríguez was very brave, very detached, and consistent. Maybe there are new guerrillas out there, I do not know, but it is very nice to listen to Viva Chile in that way; something trembles in here." The following year, she participated in La Doña (2011) as Águeda Flores, maternal grandmother of La Quintrala and one of the most powerful women of Chilean society in the 15th century. In the same year, she participated in Los archivos del cardenal, where she played a country woman looking for her grandson who was arrested and disappeared by the DINA. This role brought her critical applause and recognition on social networks for her moving and respectable performance. According to Daniela Ramírez, "Working with Luz is the most wonderful thing that has ever happened to me," while Pablo Illanes posted on his Twitter account, "Luz Jimenez is an extraordinary actress." She played another moving role in the Matías Bize film The Life of Fish. It went on to win a Goya Award in the category of Best Spanish-Language Foreign Film.

Her next films were the romantic drama Gloria (2013) by Sebastián Lelio, along with Paulina García, and the Chilean-French autobiographical film The Dance of Reality (2014) by Alejandro Jodorowsky.

In 2014 she played a small supporting role in Las 2 Carolinas. At the launch of the telenovela, in Puente Alto, Jiménez was applauded by the public, where she received a deafening ovation. The actress declared, "For me it was a very big impact. I never expected it; it impressed me. I had never experienced something like that, an ovation for me; it fills me with joy, emotion, and gratitude." She next appeared in the series Zamudio (2015), where she met for the first time with the director . In the psychological drama, which also starred Daniel Muñoz, Francisca Gavilán, and Nicolás Rojas, she played the grandmother of Daniel Zamudio. Around the same time, she starred in the music video "Presentiemiento" by Prehistöricos.

2015–present

Theater tours and awards 
In 2015 she was recognized with an award for cinematic, theatrical, and television career at the first La Serena Film Festival. The same year, she joined the company Niño Proletario and performed with José Soza, Paola Lattus, and Ángel Lattus in El otro, directed by Luis Guenel. The play is based on the book El infarto del alma by Diamela Eltit and Paz Errázuriz, about the theme of possible love within a psychiatric hospital. The production was presented in unconventional places in the country and toured Spain, the Netherlands, and Belgium. In 2016 she starred in Fulgor with the same company, based on immigration and labor abuse. After a good reception in Chile, the play was presented to 150,000 spectators at FiraTàrrega in Spain. In the same year, she performed with Tomás Vidiella and Jaime McManus in the film La memoria de mi Padre, directed by Rodrigo Bacigalupe.

After two years she returned to television, participating in Os Dias Eram Assim (2017) on Rede Globo, performing with the Brazilian actor . In 2017 she took on an international tour with El otro, performing with the company Niño Proletario in France, at Jean Vilar Theater, Paul Éluard Theater, La Ferne du Buisson, Théatre de la Ville, and Jean Arpo Theater. The project received the largest grant delivered by the National Television Council of Chile (CNTV) for its production in 2018.

Filmography

Film

Telenovelas

Other TV series

Theater

Acting

Directing 
 Mama Rosa, 1998
 Time and the Conways, 2004
 The Shoemaker's Prodigious Wife, 2005
 Beauty and the Beast (ADAE)
 Nuestro pueblo, 2008
 Amor herido
 A Doll's House
 The Bald Soprano, 2014

Music videos

Awards and nominations

References

External links 
 

1934 births
20th-century Chilean actresses
20th-century Chilean educators
21st-century Chilean actresses
21st-century Chilean educators
Actresses from Santiago
Chilean film actresses
Chilean stage actresses
Chilean telenovela actresses
Chilean theatre directors
Living people
Pontifical Catholic University of Chile alumni
Women theatre directors